Castlemartin may refer to:

Castlemartin, Pembrokeshire, a village in Wales
Castlemartin (hundred), a former administrative unit in Wales named after the village
Castlemartin Training Area, British Army training area
Castlemartin House and Estate, County Kildare, Ireland